Eugen Wiesberger Sr. (born 23 March 1900, date of death unknown) was an Austrian wrestler. He competed in the men's Greco-Roman heavyweight at the 1928 Summer Olympics.

References

External links
 

1900 births
Year of death missing
Austrian male sport wrestlers
Olympic wrestlers of Austria
Wrestlers at the 1928 Summer Olympics